Iya Rafaelivna Andrushchak (born 13 March 1987) is a Ukrainian former footballer who played as a midfielder. She has been a member of the Ukraine women's national team.

Honours 
Zvezda Perm
Winner
 Russian Women's Football Championship: 2014
 Russian Women's Cup: 2015

Runner-up
 Russian Women's Football Championship: 2013

External links 
 

1987 births
Living people
People with acquired Ukrainian citizenship
Ukrainian women's footballers
Women's association football midfielders
Ukraine women's international footballers
WFC Zhytlobud-1 Kharkiv players
WFC Lehenda-ShVSM Chernihiv players
Footballers from Saint Petersburg
Russian women's footballers
Kubanochka Krasnodar players
Zvezda 2005 Perm players